A by-election to the French National Assembly was held in the Comoros on 31 May 1959. The result was a victory for the List for the Fifth Republic, which won both seats up for election. The two seats were taken by Saïd Mohamed Cheikh and Saïd Ibrahim Ben Ali.

Results

References

Comoros
Elections in the Comoros
1959 in the Comoros
By-elections to the National Assembly (France)
May 1959 events in Africa